The .700 Nitro Express (17.8×89mmR) is a big game rifle cartridge. The cartridge is typically charged with around 250 grains of powder, in addition to a two-grain igniter charge (to reduce the tendency of the cartridge to hang fire from such large powder charges). The cartridge was introduced in 1988 by the boutique gunmakers Holland & Holland (H&H) of London, England. It was developed by Jim Bell and William Feldstein and built by H&H. Feldstein had tried unsuccessfully to get H&H to build a .600 Nitro Express for him, but they had already ceased production. However, when Bell and Feldstein produced an entirely new .700 Nitro Express cartridge, they were able to attract the interest of H&H, which was looking for a new big-bore cartridge. After production began, the backlog of orders was so great that it continued to 2007 and H&H restarted the production of .600 Nitro Express guns.

Specifications
In many respects, this cartridge parallels the .600 Nitro Express. It is essentially a scaled-up version of that cartridge, but is somewhat more powerful, and fires a heavier 1,000-grain (64.8 g) bullet. The case itself is a completely new case, not simply another case resized. Double rifles are extremely expensive, starting at about US$10,000 and selling up to US$260,000 in 2015, and have generally been replaced by repeater-rifles using rounds such as the .458 Winchester Magnum.

Single factory loaded .700 Nitro cartridges are available, typically at US$100 each.

Ballistics
However, doing so necessitates a rifle so heavy it is almost inoperable for hunting purposes.

This is more than ten times the average recoil from a .308 Winchester which is a very common hunting caliber, and more than 4 times the recoil of a strong .45-70 Government round.

Comparable calibers
Rifle calibers comparable to the .700 Nitro Express in terms of power and recoil include the following:

.600 Nitro Express
.600 Overkill
.585 Nyati
.577 Tyrannosaur
.585 Hubel express
.475 A&M Magnum
.460 Weatherby Magnum
12.7×108mm
14.5×114mm
.50 BMG
2 bore
.950 JDJ (the world's largest rifle cartridge)
20×102mm Vulcan (One of the most powerful rifle rounds, used in anti-materiel rifles)

See also
 List of rifle cartridges
 Table of handgun and rifle cartridges

References

External links

Pistol and rifle cartridges
British firearm cartridges
Holland & Holland cartridges